I Started Out with Nothin and I Still Got Most of It Left (styled i Started out with nothin and i Still got most of it Left) is the third album by Seasick Steve. It was released on September 29, 2008. It entered the UK Albums Chart at number 9 on October 6, 2008. The album is his first on the record label Warner Bros. Records, but the vinyl releases are still on his old label, Bronzerat Records.

The record features guest musicians Ruby Turner, Grinderman and KT Tunstall. Turner's vocals were originally performed by Tunstall, although she later backed out of this role, but is still featured on the album playing flute, guitar and singing backing vocals.

The album was released in two ways: the standard edition (with only 11 tracks on one disc), and the Die Cut limited edition, which includes three bonus tracks on disc one and also a bonus disc with six tracks (two songs, four spoken word).

iTunes download, included 11 tracks.

Track listing
All song written by Seasick Steve except where noted.

Disc 1
 "Started Out with Nothin"
 "Walkin Man"
 "St. Louis Slim"
 "Happy Man"
 "Prospect Lane"
 "Thunderbird"
 "Fly by Night"
 "Just Like a King" (Seasick Steve and Nick Cave)
 "One True"
 "Chiggers"
 "My Youth"
 "The Letter" (Wayne Carson Thompson) [*]
 "Levy Camp Blues" (Mississippi Fred McDowell) [*]
 "Roll and Tumble Blues" (Hambone Willie Newbern) [*]
 "The Log Cabin" (hidden track)

Tracks marked [*] only appear on the Die Cut Limited Edition disc 1.

Bonus disc 2
 "Train" (spoken word)
 "Story" (spoken word)
 "Breakfast" (spoken word)
 "Heart Attack"
 "Lunch" (spoken word)
 "Laughin' to Keep from Cryin'" (Mississippi Joe Callicott)

Personnel

Musicians
Seasick Steve - vocals, lead guitar and foot percussion
Dan Magnusson - drums
Ruby Turner - vocals (track 4)
KT Tunstall - rhythm guitar (track 4), backing vocals (track 5 & 12) & flute (track 12)
Grinderman (track 8)
Nick Cave - vocals
Jim Sclavunos - drums, percussion
Warren Ellis - fiddle
Kim Fleming - backing vocals (track 1 & 4)
Gale Mayes - backing vocals (track 1 & 4)

Other personnel
Nick Brine - Engineering
John Davis - Mastering
Christopher Rowe - Mixing

Charts

Weekly charts

Year-end charts

References

2008 albums
Seasick Steve albums
Warner Records albums